The Soulangh Cultural Park is a multi-purpose park in Jiali District, Tainan, Taiwan.

History
The cultural park was originally built as Jiali Sugar Factory or Soulangh Sugar Refinery in 1906 during the Japanese rule of Taiwan. The factory was closed down in 1995. In 2003, the Soulangh Cultural Park Preparatory Office was established. The factory was then transformed into Soulangh Cultural Park and was opened in 2005. In 2013, it initiated the Soulangh Artist Village.

Architecture
The cultural park also consists of 14 former warehouses of the factory. It also has library, playroom and museum.

Exhibitions
The cultural park displays exhibitions on Tainan folk art and Siraya people.

See also
 List of tourist attractions in Taiwan

References

External links

 

2005 establishments in Taiwan
Cultural centers in Tainan
Industrial buildings completed in 1906
Sugar refineries in Taiwan